Jonathan Rowe (1907 — 1953) was an English footballer who played at right-back for Manchester Central, Reading, Queen's Park Rangers, and Port Vale before World War II.

Career
Rowe played for Manchester Central, Reading and Queen's Park Rangers, before joining Port Vale in May 1937. He played 37 Third Division North games during the 1937–38 season, and featured in 35 Third Division South in the 1938–39 campaign. He left The Old Recreation Ground during World War II, though later guested for Crewe Alexandra.

Career statistics
Source:

References

1907 births
1953 deaths
Footballers from Stoke-on-Trent
English footballers
Association football defenders
Reading F.C. players
Queens Park Rangers F.C. players
Port Vale F.C. players
Manchester Central F.C. players
Crewe Alexandra F.C. wartime guest players
English Football League players